Golden Belt Historic District is a national historic district located at Durham, Durham County, North Carolina. The district encompasses 116 contributing buildings in a mixed industrial, commercial, and residential section of Durham. The focus of the district are the Romanesque Revival style buildings associated with the Golden Belt Manufacturing Company plant.  Associated with the company are 109 worker's houses built in 1900-1902 and bungalows built in the late 1910s.

It was listed on the National Register of Historic Places in 1985, with a boundary increase in 1996.

References

Historic districts on the National Register of Historic Places in North Carolina
Romanesque Revival architecture in North Carolina
Neoclassical architecture in North Carolina
Historic districts in Durham, North Carolina
National Register of Historic Places in Durham County, North Carolina
1985 establishments in North Carolina
Neighborhoods in Durham, North Carolina